Kazimierz Gierżod (6 August 1936 in Warsaw – 1 April 2018 in Grodzisk Mazowiecki) was a Polish pianist.

Soon after graduating at Siena's Accademia Chigliana he won Gdańsk 1964 Festival of Young Musicians' 1st prize. An intercontinental career ensued. He served as rector at the Fryderyk Chopin Music Academy (1987–94), where he held a professorship.

References 
 Fryderyk Chopin Music Academy
 Narodowy Instytut Fryderyka Chopina

1936 births
2018 deaths
Polish classical pianists
Male classical pianists
Musicians from Warsaw